Ixobrychus is a genus of bitterns, a group of wading bird in the heron family Ardeidae. 
It has a single representative species in each of North America, South America, Eurasia, and Australasia. The tropical species are largely resident, but the two northern species are partially migratory, with many birds moving south to warmer areas in winter.

The species of the genus Ixobrychus are all small, with their four larger relatives being in the genus Botaurus. They breed in large reedbeds, and can often be difficult to observe except for occasional flight views due to their secretive behaviour. Like other bitterns, they eat fish, frogs, and similar aquatic life.

Taxonomy
The genus Ixobrychus was introduced in 1828 by the Swedish naturalist Gustaf Johan Billberg who listed two members of the genus but did not specify the type species. This was designated as the little bittern by Witmer Stone in 1907. The genus name combines the Ancient Greek ixias, a reed-like plant and brukhomai, to bellow.

The genus contains ten species This includes the New Zealand bittern which is now extinct.

Extant species

The New Zealand bittern (Ixobrychus novaezelandiae) is extinct.

References

 

Bird genera